At least two beetles are known as the rose chafer:
Cetonia aurata, in Europe
Macrodactylus subspinosus, in North America

Animal common name disambiguation pages